Kieran Delahunty is an Irish hurler who formerly played with Roanmore GAA at club level and with Waterford GAA at inter-county level.

Kieran played at either centre or wing forward and was well known for his scoring ability.  Kieran was Waterford's main free taker and was notable for his accuracy with the dead ball.

With Roanmore GAA, Kieran won two Waterford Senior Hurling Championships in 1989 and 1990.

Honours
Father of Kevin Delahunty
 Waterford Senior Hurling Championship winner - 1989 and 1990
 Munster Senior Hurling Championship runners-up - 1989

References

Waterford inter-county hurlers
Roanmore hurlers
People from Waterford (city)
Living people
Year of birth missing (living people)